Teodor Moraru (24 March 1938 – 14 September 2011) was a contemporary Romanian painter.

Life and career 

Teodor Moraru was born in Îndărăptnici (today Nucăreni), a village in Orhei county, in Kingdom of Romania (today in Republic of Moldova). His father, Ion Moraru was a notary and his mother, Elisabeta née Goncearenko, was a teacher.
In 1944, when the young Moraru was only six years old, the family flees to Transylvania, settling in Fundata commune, in Brașov county. In 1949 the family resettles in Poiana Mărului, where Moraru will attend gymnasium school. Here he meets Horia Bernea, with whom he develops a lifelong friendship. During this time, Moraru's parents divorce. His mother moves to Luciu commune, where she lived and taught until her death in 1985, and his father moves to Moieciu commune, near Bran, accepting a notary position and registering his son to a professional school near Brașov. After one year of military service, he enrols at the Technical School of Architecture in Bucharest (STACO), where again he finds Horia Bernea as a colleague and friend.

He graduates STACO in 1963. However, during this time, his interest shifts towards painting. In 1968 Moraru joins the Poiana Mărului Group, an intellectual circle of artists founded by Horia Bernea. The group highly influenced Moraru's early artistic development.

In 1971 Moraru holds his first solo exhibition at "Simeza Gallery" in Bucharest. This was followed by further solo shows in 1974, 1977, 1980. During 1983 he was artist-in-residence at the Cité internationale des arts in Paris where he also held a solo exhibition in 1984. Along the years, his works have been exhibited at important galleries from Paris, Copenhagen, Vienna, Prague, Berlin, Lisbon, Darmstadt, Tokyo, Hanoi and others.

In 1991 he takes up teaching at the Academy of Arts "Luceafarul" from Bucharest, where he will continue to teach until 2005. In 2003 some of his former pupils formed the group "Colonia 21".

During his career, Moraru received several important prizes among which is the Jury Prize of the Romanian Art Union, and the title of "Great Officer" in 2004, for his entire career.

In 2011 Moraru was admitted to the Municipal Hospital in Bucharest after suffering a minor stroke, and died on 14 September after complications arose during the medical treatment.

The Teodor Moraru Grant 

Founded in his memory, the Teodor Moraru Grant for painting was awarded between 2014 and 2018 to Romanian artists under 35 years of age.

Selected Prizes and Honors 

 1980, Prize of "Arta" Magazine
 1991, The Special Prize of The Romanian Art Union
 1993, "Ion Andreescu" Prize from Romanian Academy
 2001, First Prize for Painting of "Millenium2001" Exhibition
 2001, Special Prize at "Lascăr Viorel" Exhibition, Piatra Neamț, Romania
 2002, Prize for Painting from The Art Museum of Bacău, Romania
 2003, The Jury Prize of The Romanian Art Union
 2004, The Prize of Minister of Culture of The Republic of Moldova
 2004, Awarded the Cultural Distinction of a "Great Officer"
 2004, The Great Prize of The Romanian Art Union

Gallery

References

External links 

 Official Page

Modern painters
Romanian painters
Artists from Bucharest
1938 births
2011 deaths